George Braithwaite may refer to:

George Braith (born George Braithwaite, 1939), American saxophonist
Sir George Braithwaite, 2nd Baronet (1762–1809), of the Braithwaite baronets

See also
Braithwaite (surname)